Cultura en Vivo is the first live album by the Puerto Rican reggae band, Cultura Profética. It was recorded on May 12, 2000, at the Tito Puente Amphitheatre in San Juan, Puerto Rico, and released on June 19, 2001.

Track listing
All tracks by Cultura Profética except where noted.

 "Mr. Swin' y el Tres Pasitos Jazz Ensemble" – 4:07
 "Suelta los Amarres" – 6:37
 Medley Canción de Alerta: Enyoyando/Con Truenos Hay Que Hablar/Despertar/Lucha y Sacrificio/Por Qué Cantamos/Tempestad Tranquila/Population Disorder/Filitustrein" – 17:26
 "La Otra Galaxia" – 2:37
 "Ideas Nuevas" – 6:17
 "Funkadera" – 9:29
 "Advertencia" – 7:40
 "No Me Busques" – 6:25
 "Pasiones, Guerrillas y Muerte" – 5:22
 "Fruto de la Tierra" – 6:33
 "Ya No Hay" (Guillermo Bonetto, Cafress, Adrián Canedo) (feat. Los Cafres) – 5:25

Personnel

Musicians
Errol Brown – mixing
Los Cafres – performer
William Cepeda – trombone, caracoles
Frank Cesarano – mastering
Alex Diaz – photography
Eduardo Fernandez – trombone
Gallego – liner notes
Raúl López – executive producer
Thomas Pearson – guitar
Raffi Torres – trombone
Juan V. – assistant

Production
 Produced by Willy Rodríguez, Eliut González, Iván Gutiérrez, Boris Bilbraut, Omar Silva
 Executive producers – Luar Music and Cultura Profética
 Recorded May 12, 2000 at the Tito Puente Amphitheatre in San Juan, Puerto Rico
 mixed at Circle House, Miami, Florida
 mix engineer – Errol Brown

References

Cultura Profética albums
2001 live albums